Ernest Ecuyer (11 May 1934 – 5 October 2008) was a Swiss racing cyclist. He rode in the 1958 Tour de France.

References

1934 births
2008 deaths
Swiss male cyclists
Place of birth missing